Downing House is a historic home located at Memphis, Scotland County, Missouri. It was built about 1858, and is a two-story brick dwelling with Greek Revival and Italian Villa style design elements.  It measures approximately 68 feet by 48 feet, and consists of a rectangular block with a "T"-shaped section.  It features a three-story tower, prominent quoins, a modillioned cornice and a mixture of round-arched and linteled windows.  The building houses a local history museum.

It was added to the National Register of Historic Places in 1979.

References

History museums in Missouri
Houses on the National Register of Historic Places in Missouri
Greek Revival houses in Missouri
Italianate architecture in Missouri
Houses completed in 1858
Buildings and structures in Scotland County, Missouri
National Register of Historic Places in Scotland County, Missouri